Ernest W. Prussman (1921 – September 8, 1944) was a United States Army soldier and a recipient of the United States military's highest decoration—the Medal of Honor—for his actions in World War II.

Biography
He was born in 1921 in Baltimore, Maryland to Herbert Werner Prussman.

Prussman joined the Army from Brighton, Massachusetts in October 1942 and by September 8, 1944, was serving as a private first class in the 13th Infantry Regiment, 8th Infantry Division. On that day, near Loscoat (now an industrial district of Brest) in Brittany, France, Prussman advanced ahead of his unit and single-handedly captured several enemy soldiers and destroyed a machine gun nest before being killed. He was posthumously awarded the Medal of Honor seven months later, on April 17, 1945.

Prussman was buried at the Brittany American Cemetery and Memorial in Saint-James, Normandy, France.

Medal of Honor citation
Private First Class Prussman's official Medal of Honor citation reads:
For conspicuous gallantry and intrepidity at risk of life above and beyond the call of duty on September 8, 1944, near Les Coates [most probably a wrong transcription of Loscoat], Brittany, France. When the advance of the flank companies of 2 battalions was halted by intense enemy mortar, machinegun, and sniper fire from a fortified position on his left, Pfc. Prussman maneuvered his squad to assault the enemy fortifications. Hurdling a hedgerow, he came upon 2 enemy riflemen whom he disarmed. After leading his squad across an open field to the next hedgerow, he advanced to a machinegun position, destroyed the gun, captured its crew and 2 riflemen. Again advancing ahead of his squad in the assault, he was mortally wounded by an enemy rifleman, but as he fell to the ground he threw a handgrenade, killing his opponent. His superb leadership and heroic action at the cost of his life so demoralized the enemy that resistance at this point collapsed, permitting the 2 battalions to continue their advance.

Memorial

A statue of Prussman was dedicated on Memorial Day 2018 at 1 Murdock Street in the Brighton neighborhood of Boston. Boston College provided a grant for the statue. Jeff Buccacio was the sculptor.

Honoring a Medal of Honor recipient in Brighton

See also

List of Medal of Honor recipients
List of Medal of Honor recipients for World War II

References

1944 deaths
United States Army personnel killed in World War II
United States Army Medal of Honor recipients
United States Army soldiers
1921 births
World War II recipients of the Medal of Honor
Deaths by firearm in France